The canton of Saint-Hilaire-de-Riez is an administrative division of the Vendée department, western France. It was created at the French canton reorganisation which came into effect in March 2015. Its seat is in Saint-Hilaire-de-Riez.

It consists of the following communes:
 
L'Aiguillon-sur-Vie
Brem-sur-Mer
Bretignolles-sur-Mer
La Chaize-Giraud
Coëx
Commequiers
Le Fenouiller
Givrand
Landevieille
Saint-Gilles-Croix-de-Vie
Saint-Hilaire-de-Riez
Saint-Maixent-sur-Vie
Saint-Révérend

References

Cantons of Vendée